Sennefer was an Ancient Egyptian official with the title Servant in the Place of Truth at the end of the 18th Dynasty. He is mainly known due to his unlooted burial found in 1928 by excavations under Bernard Bruyère at Deir el-Medina. The burial chamber of Sennefer was found within the tomb of the servant at the place of truth Hormes (tomb no. 1159a). The small chamber contained the inscribed coffins of Sennefer and his wife Nefertiti. Both were found wrapped in linen. Sennefer was also adorned with a mummy mask. He had a heart scarab and was adorned with a pectoral. On his coffin was placed a painted piece of cloth, showing Sennefer before an offering table. Furthermore, the burial contained different types of furniture, including a bed, a box, a head rest and several pottery as well as stone vessels. The burial of a child in an undecorated box was found, too. Two shabti figures are datable by style to the end of the 18th Dynasty.

References

Bibliography 
Julie Tomsová, Zuzana Schierová: Skeletal Material From Deir El-Medina in The Egyptological Collection of the Hrdlička Museum Of Man in Prague, in: Annals of The Náprstek Museum 37/1 (2016), pp. 51–59 (includes a list of the objects with current location and museum numbers) online.

External links 
 Cédric Gobeil: The IFAO Excavations at Deir el-Medina  Aug 2015

Eighteenth Dynasty of Egypt
Ancient Egyptian artists